Arundhati Reddy (born 4 October 1997) is an Indian cricketer. In August 2018, she was named in the India Women's squad for their series against the Sri Lanka Women. She made her Women's Twenty20 International cricket (WT20I) debut for India against Sri Lanka Women on 19 September 2018.

In October 2018, she was named in India's squad for the 2018 ICC Women's World Twenty20 tournament in the West Indies. In January 2020, she was named in India's squad for the 2020 ICC Women's T20 World Cup in Australia.

In May 2021, she was named in India's Test squad for their one-off match against the England women's cricket team.

References

External links

 

1997 births
Living people
Cricketers from Hyderabad, India
Indian women cricketers
India women Twenty20 International cricketers
Hyderabad women cricketers
Railways women cricketers
IPL Supernovas cricketers
IPL Trailblazers cricketers
Delhi Capitals (WPL) cricketers